Lębork Dretowo is a non-operational PKP railway station in Lębork (Pomeranian Voivodeship), Poland.

Lines crossing the station

References 
Lębork Dretowo article at Polish Stations Database, URL accessed at 27 March 2006

Railway stations in Pomeranian Voivodeship
Disused railway stations in Pomeranian Voivodeship
Lębork County